Las Manaclas is a town in San José de las Matas, in Santiago Province, Dominican Republic.

Populated places in Santiago Province (Dominican Republic)